The Party for the Commonwealth of Canada was a Canadian political party formed by Canadians who supported the ideology of the late U.S. politician Lyndon LaRouche in the 1984, 1988 and 1993 elections.

In the 1988 election, party leader Gilles Gervais led a slate of 58 candidates campaigning against the monarchy, hemispheric free trade, dollarization of Latin American economies, and financial oligarchy.

The party never won any seats. It was also known as the Party for the Commonwealth-Republic, and as the Committee for the Republic of Canada.

See also
 List of political parties in Canada
Commonwealth Party candidates, 1993 Canadian federal election
Commonwealth Party candidates, 1988 Canadian federal election
Commonwealth Party candidates, 1984 Canadian federal election
 North American Labour Party

LaRouche movement
Commonwealth of Canada, Party for the
Republicanism in Canada